Legendborn is a 2020 debut young adult fantasy novel by Tracy Deonn. Called "a modern day twist on Arthurian legend", it follows a black teenage girl who discovers a secret and historically white magic society. The book is the first in the Legendborn series. It was released on September 15, 2020, and it was published under Simon & Schuster/McElderry. Legendborn received the Coretta Scott King Award/John Steptoe Award for New Talent as well as a nomination for the Los Angeles Times Book Prize.

Plot summary 
The novel's main character is 16-year-old Bree Matthews, a college student who attempts to infiltrate a historically white magical society at the University of North Carolina at Chapel Hill when she finds out that some members may have been involved in her mother's recent death.

Three months after her mother's death, Bree attends the University of North Carolina with her friend Alice. On the first night, they sneak out of campus with a group of people. They get caught and are given peer mentors to watch over them due to breaking the law. While Bree is walking with her peer mentor Nick, a 'shadowborn' monster appears, and Nick slays it with a sword. Bree is then taken to an unknown building where a strange man attempts to erase her mind, but fails without knowing so.

Through Nick, Bree discovers a secret organization that is full of Legendborn nobles -- descendants from fifteen of King Arthur's knights. She gradually recovers her memory of her mother's death and is able to uncover the mage's organization enough to decide to infiltrate it as a page, which is a person training to defend the Legendborn nobles.

Over time, she slowly uncovers more about the society. The fifteen knights reincarnate into a descendant called a Scion. Each knight sometimes calls their Scion, which gives them power at the cost of a shortened life, and there is a set order in which they are called. The descendants of Merlin are mages called Merlins, like the mage who attempted to wipe Bree's memory earlier in the book, Sel. As Nick and Bree's relationship grows, Sel begins to suspect that Bree is an undercover shadow monster, complicating her chances of becoming a Page.

Bree's therapist has connections to a group that uses magic (called Root) differently than the descendants of Arthur. The Root practitioners call the Legendborn magic bloodcraft and hate its users; bloodcraft grants lots of power, but it always comes at a cost. For the Legendborn, it means that their lives are shortened.

While studying with the Root practitioners, she learns that Sel is part-demon. Bree confronts Sel, and Sel reveals that their demonic nature as descendants of Merlin is why they are bound young in oaths.

Background 
Tracy Deonn was inspired by The Dark is Rising series by Susan Cooper. She was also influenced by the death of her mother. Having worked in video games, she took that knowledge to help develop the stringent rules that guide the magical system described in the book.

Publication history 
 2020. First edition hardcover. Publication date September 15, 2020. Simon & Schuster/McElderry,

Reception 
Legendborn received critical acclaim. Publishers Weekly stated, "Though hazy exposition initially slows the narrative, Deonn adeptly employs the haunting history of the American South [...] to explore themes of ancestral pain, grief, and love, balancing them with stimulating worldbuilding and multiple thrilling plot twists." In a starred review Bookpage praised Deonn's writing: "Legendborn establishes Deonn as an important new voice in YA. Its gorgeous prose and heart-splitting honesty compel an eyes-wide-open reading experience."

Syfy.com called the book "a refreshing twist on classic Arthurian legend with a lot of Southern Black girl magic to boot." In a similarly positive review, Natalie Berglind wrote in a review for the Bulletin of the Center for Children's Books, "Deonn brings Arthurian legend to life with originality, a dash of heart-pounding demon-slaying, and a deep and meaningful acknowledgement of the violent roots of slavery in U.S. history." Kirkus Reviews noted: "Representation of actualized, strong queer characters is organic, not forced, and so are textual conversations around emotional wellness and intergenerational trauma [...] Well-crafted allusions to established legends and other literary works are delightful easter eggs."

The book was recommended by BuzzFeed, Nerdist, and io9. Legendborn was on the New York Times Best Seller List for nine weeks.

Accolades

2020 
Los Angeles Times Book Prize - Best Young Adult Novel, Finalist
 School Library Journal - Best Young Adult Books

2021 
Coretta Scott King Award/John Steptoe Award for New Talent, Winner
American Library Association, Top Ten Amazing Audiobooks for Young Adults
YALSA, Best Fiction for Young Adults
 Lodestar Award for Best Young Adult Book - Finalist
 Locus Awards for Best Young Adult Book - Finalist
 American Library Association - YALSA's Teens' Top Ten, Nominee
 Ignyte Award, Best Novel - YA

Television adaptation 
On February 2, 2022, it was announced that Black Bear Television acquired the rights to adapt the book into a television series, with screenwriter Felicia D. Henderson as the co-executive producer.

References

External links 

 Official website

2020 debut novels
Young adult fantasy novels
Literature by African-American women
Novels set in North Carolina
2020 American novels
Simon & Schuster books
Modern Arthurian fiction
University of North Carolina at Chapel Hill
African-American novels